Celebrity Big Brother 10 was the tenth series of the British reality television series Celebrity Big Brother. It launched on 15 August 2012, two days after the final of Big Brother 13, and aired on Channel 5 and 5* for 24 days until 7 September 2012. It was the third celebrity series to air on Channel 5 as part of a contract extension of the current two-year contract with Endemol, and the fifth series of Big Brother to air on Channel 5 since they acquired the show. The series was sponsored by hair product brand Schwarzkopf Live Color XXL. It was won by comedian Julian Clary, with television presenter Coleen Nolan as runner-up. First evictee, Jasmine Lennard, later appeared as a guest for a two-day stint on Big Brother 16.

Coleen Nolan returned to the house for Celebrity Big Brother 19 as an All-Star representing this series. She won this series.

Pre-series

Background 

Initially, only one series of Big Brother and Celebrity Big Brother was planned to air once a year over the span of two years, but on 27 March 2012, Channel 5 announced that a second celebrity series would air in 2012. This is the first time that two series of Celebrity Big Brother have been broadcast in the same year. It was also only the second edition to be shown in summer instead of winter. Big Brother 13 was originally planned to run for thirteen weeks but was cut back to ten weeks to accommodate this series.

Adverts 

The first trailer for the series was broadcast on 9 August, which showed host Brian Dowling in the Diary Room, with Big Brother telling him who would be entering the House, reacting excitedly. A teaser clip showing facial features of all the celebrity housemates was shown on 11 August 2012.

Logo 

The eye logo for the series was revealed on 4 August 2012. The eye remained similar to the Big Brother 13 logo, but with the iconic Celebrity Big Brother star in the centre and the rest of the eye reversed.

Voting 

The only way for viewers to vote during this series was by calling a premium rate telephone number. It had initially been announced that Facebook voting would be in effect for this series but due to technical issues during Big Brother 13, Channel 5 cancelled these plans. The public voted for who they wanted to save and they voted for their winner in the final two days.

House 

The house remained largely unchanged from the thirteenth regular series. A separate room became the gym, the theme of the bedroom changed to a new maroon colour, with changed beds and a completely new carpet, the shower door was replaced and cameras were removed from the toilets, and new rugs were placed on the bathroom floor and the entrance to the garden. The sofas were also brand new to the Celebrity Big Brother House.

Twists

Live nominations 

On Day 3, housemates nominated live on Channel 5, on the spin-off show Celebrity Big Brother: Live from the House. The nominations took place face-to-face in the living room, where Big Brother told housemates that they were required to nominate just one housemate to face the public vote. As a result of this, with three nominations each, Jasmine and Rhian were nominated for eviction and Jasmine was evicted six days later.

Jasmine's mother 

After the second live eviction, Big Brother's Bit on the Side host Emma Willis revealed that Jasmine's mother, Marilyn Galsworthy, would enter the house during the weekend, and would be controlled by Jasmine through an earpiece as part of a task. During the task, Marilyn posed as 'Shelley' a supposedly famous medium who had entered the house after causing controversy in the outside world. If the housemates sussed out that 'Shelley' was a fake, Jasmine and Marilyn would not receive their special prize - the chance to grant two housemates of their choice immunity from the impending nominations. As the housemates knew she was a fake, Jasmine and Marilyn lost the task and the nominations were carried out as normal.

Housemates

Ashley McKenzie 

Ashley McKenzie (born 17 July 1989) is an English judoka and member of the Great Britain judo squad competing in the men's 60 kg category. At the 2012 Summer Olympics, he was defeated in the second round. Having received only one nomination and never facing eviction for his entire stay, Ashley made the final on Day 24. He left the house in fifth position.

Cheryl Fergison 

Cheryl Fergison (born 27 August 1965) is an English actress, most notable for playing Heather Trott in EastEnders. On Day 1, Cheryl, along with fellow housemate Julie were set a secret mission in which they had to follow Big Brother's directions in order to create drama in the house. Since they performed to Big Brother's satisfaction, they won their housemates a party. She was nominated for eviction on Day 8. On Day 10, she received the fewest votes and became the second housemate to be evicted from the house, despite the bookmaker's favourites to win the show.

Coleen Nolan 

Coleen Patricia Nolan (born 12 March 1965) is an English television presenter, author, singer, and the youngest member of the girl group The Nolans. Nolan has since been a panellist on Loose Women and a contestant on Dancing on Ice. She was nominated for eviction on Day 8. Coleen made the Big Brother Final and was declared this year's runner up, finishing in 2nd place. She later returned to compete in Celebrity Big Brother 19 as an "All star" housemate where she became the winner.

Danica Thrall 

Sonia Danica Thrall, known by her modelling name Danica Thrall (born 30 March 1988) is a model and reality TV personality, known for appearing in the documentary Sex, Lies & Rinsing Guys and being a regular presenter on televised sex line Elite TV. She was nominated for eviction on Day 15, but survived the vote. She was evicted on Day 17 in a double eviction.

Harvey 

Michael Harvey, Jr (born 1 May 1979), aka MC Harvey, is an English musician and former non-league footballer, best known as a member of So Solid Crew. Harvey made the final on Day 24 after never facing eviction during his entire stay within the Big Brother house. He was the first to leave on finale night finishing in 6th place.

Jasmine Lennard 

Jasmine Lennard (born 25 July 1985) is an English model, known for appearing on Make Me a Supermodel and for her publicised affair with Simon Cowell. On Day 3, in the face-to-face nominations she received three votes, and so was put up for eviction with Rhian. She received the fewest votes and so on Day 8 became the first person to be evicted. On Day 11, she returned to the diary room and task room in the 'Like Mother Like Daughter' task, in which her mother, Marilyn Galsworthy, entered the house whilst Jasmine gave her instructions via a hidden earpiece.

Julian Clary 

Julian Peter McDonald Clary (born 25 May 1959) is an English comedian and novelist, known for his deliberately stereotypical camp style, with a heavy reliance on innuendo and double entendre. He has also acted in films, television, and on stage. He was nominated for eviction on Day 8 but survived and later went on to become the winner of the series on Day 24.

Julie Goodyear 

Julie Goodyear, MBE (born Julie Kemp, 29 March 1942) is an English actress, best known for playing the long-running role of Bet Lynch on soap opera Coronation Street for over 28 years. On Day 1, Julie was the first housemate to enter the Celebrity Big Brother House, where she was given a secret mission along with fellow housemate Cheryl where they both had to create drama in the house by following instructions by Big Brother through earpieces. They both performed to Big Brother's satisfaction and won a party in the garden. She became the seventh celebrity to be evicted from the house on Day 22, losing out to Martin and a place in the Big Brother Final.

Martin Kemp 

Martin John Kemp (born 10 October 1961) is an English actor and musician, best known as the bassist in the New Romantic band Spandau Ballet, as well as for his portrayal as Steve Owen in EastEnders. He was nominated for eviction on Day 19 and having survived made the Big Brother final on Day 24 leaving the house in 3rd place.

Prince Lorenzo 

Lorenzo Borghese (born 9 June 1972), commonly known as Prince Lorenzo, is a member of the House of Borghese, a cosmetics entrepreneur and animal advocate and the featured bachelor on the ninth series of The Bachelor. He was nominated for eviction on Day 8. Prince Lorenzo was evicted from the house on Day 22 after receiving the fewest viewer votes.

Rhian Sugden 
Rhian Marie Sugden (born 11 September 1986) is an English glamour model and Page Three girl. She was nominated for eviction on Day 3 with Jasmine Lennard but survived the vote. She was then nominated again on Day 12 and was evicted on Day 15.

Samantha Brick 

Samantha Brick (born 1971) is a journalist who is publicly known for a column in the Daily Mail, Why Women Hate Me for Being Beautiful. On Day 17, she was the fourth housemate to be evicted, after losing votes to Coleen and Danica.

The Situation 

Michael Sorrentino (born 4 July 1982), aka "The Situation", is best known as a cast member on the American reality show Jersey Shore. He was nominated for eviction on Day 8, but survived. On Day 24, finale night, he finished in fourth place.

Weekly summary

Nominations table

Notes

Ratings and reception 

On 15 August 2012, the launch show drew 2.7 million viewers, and is down on the ninth series earlier in January which drew 3.5 million viewers. On 7 September 2012, the finale show drew 2.1 million viewers, and again is down on the ninth series by a million viewers.

Television ratings 

Official ratings are taken from BARB.

References

External links 
 
 Official Celebrity Big Brother Page
 

2012 in British television
2012 British television seasons
10
Channel 5 (British TV channel) reality television shows